Genista hispanica, the Spanish gorse, or anlaga, is a species of flowering plant in the family Fabaceae, native to southern France and northern Spain. It is suited for borders, wall and rock gardens, gravelly soils, and coastal situations.

Subtaxa
The following subspecies are accepted:
Genista hispanica subsp. hispanica
Genista hispanica subsp. occidentalis

References

hispanica
Flora of France
Flora of Spain
Plants described in 1753 
Taxa named by Carl Linnaeus